Lethata anophthalma is a moth of the family Depressariidae. It is found in Brazil (Paraná, Amazonas), Venezuela, Bolivia, Paraguay, northern Argentina, French Guiana and Guyana.

The larvae feed on Psidium guajava.

References

Moths described in 1931
Lethata